HMS Dainty was a D-class destroyer built for the Royal Navy in the early 1930s. The ship was initially assigned to the Mediterranean Fleet before she was transferred to the China Station in early 1935. She was temporarily deployed in the Red Sea during late 1935 during the Abyssinia Crisis, before returning to her assigned station where she remained until mid-1939. Dainty was transferred back to the Mediterranean Fleet just before World War II began in September 1939. She briefly was assigned to West Africa for convoy escort duties in 1940 before returning to the Mediterranean. The ship participated in the Battle of Calabria in July 1940 and was assigned to convoy escort and patrol duties until she was sunk by German bombers off Tobruk on 24 February 1941.

Description
Steam for the turbines was provided by three Admiralty 3-drum water-tube boilers. The ship's complement was 145 officers and men.

The ship mounted four 45-calibre QF 4.7-inch Mark IX guns in single mounts. For anti-aircraft (AA) defence, Dainty had a single 12-pounder (3-inch (76.2 mm)) gun and two quadruple Mark I mounts for the QF 0.5-inch Vickers Mark III machine gun. She was fitted with two above-water quadruple torpedo tube mounts for 21-inch torpedoes. One depth charge rail and two throwers were fitted; 20 depth charges were originally carried, but this increased to 35 shortly after the war began.

Career
Dainty was ordered on 2 February 1931 under the 1930 Naval Estimates and was laid down at the yards of the Fairfield Shipbuilding and Engineering Company, Govan, Scotstoun on 20 April 1931. She was launched on 3 May 1932 and completed on 22 December 1932, at a total cost of £229,378, excluding equipment supplied by the Admiralty, such as weapons, ammunition and wireless equipment.

The ship was initially assigned to the 1st Destroyer Flotilla in the Mediterranean and made a brief deployment to the Persian Gulf and Red Sea in October–November 1933. Dainty was refitted at Portsmouth between 3 September and 23 October 1934 for service on the China Station with the 8th (later the 21st) Destroyer Flotilla and arrived there on 3 January 1935. She was attached to the Mediterranean Fleet in the Red Sea from 30 September 1935 to June 1936 during the Abyssinian Crisis. The ship was refitted afterwards in Hong Kong between 21 September and 15 October and conducted anti-piracy patrols after her refit was complete. On 21 January 1937, the merchant ship SS Hsin Pekin grounded on the Nemesis Rock off Ningbo and Dainty posted a guard aboard her until she was refloated. The ship made a number of port visits in Sarawak, Singapore and the Philippines in January–March 1938. As war loomed, she was transferred to the Mediterranean Fleet, arriving at Alexandria with her sister  on 30 September 1939, after the outbreak of World War II.

Dainty was assigned to search for contraband being shipped across the Mediterranean throughout October and November, before undergoing a refit at Malta from 8–30 December. On its completion she was transferred to the 2nd Destroyer Division, based in Freetown, Sierra Leone to search for German commerce raiders operating in the South Atlantic. The ship was transferred back to the Mediterranean Fleet in April and was given another refit at Malta from 21 April to 2 June 1940. On its completion, Dainty was assigned to the 10th Destroyer Flotilla.

On 12 June, she rescued over 400 survivors from the light cruiser , which had been sunk off Crete. The crew then scuttled Liuzzi. The British ships were able to salvage important encryption material, including the latest codebook.

Dainty participated in the Battle of Calabria on 9 July as an escort for the heavy ships of Force C and unsuccessfully engaged Italian destroyers and suffered no damage. Dainty and Ilex escorted the Australian light cruiser  as she bombarded the Italian airfield on Scarpanto on 4 September.

Together with three Australian destroyers and two British anti-aircraft cruisers, the ship escorted a convoy from Egypt to Suda Bay, Crete and then to Malta in early November. In December she was assigned to intercept enemy supply convoys along the North African coast and captured two schooners off Bardia on 31 December. In early January 1941, Dainty escorted the capital ships of Force A during Operation Excess.

Sinking
Shortly afterwards, Dainty returned to patrol the North African coast. In the late afternoon of 24 February she left Tobruk on a patrol, accompanied by the destroyer . The ships were attacked by 13 Junkers Ju 88 bombers of III./Lehrgeschwader 1 and Dainty was hit by a  bomb which passed through the captain's cabin and detonated in the fuel tanks. This started a large fire, which caused her after magazine to explode and the ship to sink. 16 of Daintys crew were killed in the attack and 18 were wounded.

Notes

References

External links
 HMS Dainty at Uboat.net
 HMS Dainty on naval-history.net

 

C and D-class destroyers
World War II destroyers of the United Kingdom
Destroyers sunk by aircraft
1932 ships
Maritime incidents in February 1941
World War II shipwrecks in the Mediterranean Sea
Ships sunk by German aircraft
Naval magazine explosions